Aki (pronounced Ah-kee, /ˈækiː/) is a surname, a given name and a nickname. Aki is a common Japanese, Finnish and Nigerian given name. Aki is also a Japanese surname, and also of one of the Vysya families in India. They mainly reside in Andhra Pradesh, India.

Possible writings in Japanese

 あき, hiragana
 アキ, katakana
明, "bright"
燦, "brilliant, bright, radiance"
昭, "shining"
秋, "autumn"
彬, "refined, gentle"
爽, "refreshing, bracing, resonant, sweet"
晶, "sparkle"
暁, "daybreak"
彰, "acknowledge"
晃, "clear"
亜紀, "asia, chronicle"
亜希, "asia, hope"
愛希, "love, hope"

Possible spellings in Finnish
Achim
Akim
Ekim
Jakim

People

Given name

 Aki Avni (born 1967), Israeli actor, entertainer and television host
 Aki Berg (born 1977), Finnish former National Hockey League player
 Aki Cederberg, Finnish writer, musician and filmmaker
 Aki Hakala, Finnish drummer of The Rasmus
, Japanese musician and lyricist
 Aki Heikkinen (born 1980), Finnish decathlete
  (born 1977), Japanese gravure idol
 Aki Jones (1982-2014), American football player
 Aki Kangasmäki (born 1989), Finnish ice hockey player
 Aki Karvonen (born 1957), Finnish cross-country skier
 Aki Kaurismäki (born 1957), Finnish screenwriter and film director
  (born 1980), Japanese gravure idol
 Aki Lahtinen (born 1958), Finnish former footballer
 Aki Linnanahde, Finnish TV and radio personality
  (born 1985), Japanese actress and singer
 Aki Maeda (MAX), a member of the J-pop group MAX from 2002 to 2008
  (born 1981), Japanese singer
 , Japanese volleyball player
, Japanese speed skater
 Aki Ollikainen (born 1973), Finnish novelist
 Aki Orr (1931-2013), Israeli writer and political activist
 Aki Parviainen (born 1974), Finnish javelin thrower
 Aki Ra (born c. 1973), Cambodian landmine disposal expert and former Khmer Rouge conscripted child soldier
 Aki Riihilahti (born 1976), Finnish retired footballer
  (born 1980), Japanese artist based in New York
  (born 1988), Japanese former figure skater
 Aki Seiuli (born 1992), New Zealand rugby union player
 Aki Shibahara, Japanese musician, member of the British indie pop band Warm Jets (1997-?)
  (born 1981), Japanese former volleyball player
 Aki Shimazaki (born 1954), Canadian novelist and translator
 , Japanese manga artist
 Aki Sirkesalo (1962-2004), Finnish musician
, Japanese ice hockey player
  (born 1944), Japanese pianist
  (born 1948), Japanese jazz pianist and composer
  (born 1970), Japanese former synchronized swimmer
, Japanese speed skater
  (born 1986), a Japanese voice actress
, Japanese ice hockey player
 Aki Ulander (born 1981), Finnish basketball player
 Aki Uusikartano (born 1977), Finnish retired footballer
, Japanese field hockey player
, Japanese slalom canoeist

Nickname or stage name
 Aki Aleong (born 1934), American actor, singer and songwriter
  (born 1986), Japanese football player commonly referred to as "Aki"
 (born 1979), Japanese baseball player and manager referred to as "Aki" while playing in Major League Baseball
 Aki Kumar (born 1980), Indian-born American blues musician
 Akihiko  (born 1944), Japanese painter
 Aki Nawaz, British rapper and musician born Haq Nawaz Qureshi
 Alfred Schmidt (footballer) (1935-2016), German football player and manager
 Aki (rapper), real name Aleksi Swallow, Swedish rapper with Swedish hip hop band Labyrint

Surname
  (born 1977), Japanese singer-songwriter
 Bundee Aki (born 1990), New Zealand-Irish rugby union player
  (born 1960), Japanese pink film actress
  (1930–2005), Japanese-American geophysicist and professor
 Tong Kee or T. Aki (died 1887), Chinese immigrant businessman in the Kingdom of Hawaii involved in the Aki opium scandal
  (born 1945), Japanese songwriter, actress, novelist and essayist

Fictional and legendary characters
 Aki the Wealthy, a 10th-century Dane in the medieval Icelandic Egil's Saga
 Aki (James Bond), from the James Bond film You Only Live Twice played by Akiko Wakabayashi
 Aki Adagaki (安達垣 愛姫), in Masamune-kun's Revenge
 Aki Hayakawa, from the manga series Chainsaw Man
 Akiza Izinski, or Akiza, Aki Izayoi from Yu-Gi-Oh! 5D's
 Aki Kimura, from Medabots
 Aki Kino, from Inazuma Eleven
 Aki Mikage, twin brother of Aya Mikage from Ceres: Celestial Legend
 Aki Nikkinen, from Salatut elämät
 Aki Ross, from Final Fantasy: The Spirits Within
 Aki Shiina, protagonist of Miss Caretaker of Sunohara-sou
 Aki Shirashi, protagonist of Usurper of the Sun, a novel by Hōsuke Nojiri
 Aki Tomoya, protagonist of Saekano: How to Raise a Boring Girlfriend
 Aki Yuko, a doctor from Sky Girls
 Aki Zeta-5 (née Aki Lutinnen), leader of the Cybernetic Consciousness faction in Sid Meier's Alien Crossfire
 Aki, one of the seven daughters of the evil demon Aku, specifically trained to destroy Samurai Jack

See also
Aki (disambiguation)
Akki (name)

Japanese feminine given names
Japanese unisex given names
Finnish masculine given names
Hypocorisms